There are several municipalities and communities which have the name Langenthal:

In Germany 
Langenthal, Rhineland-Palatinate, in the district of Bad Kreuznach, Rhineland-Palatinate
Langenthal, Upper Palatinate, in the municipality of Berg, Upper Palatinate, Bavaria
Langenthal, Swabia, in the municipality of Untrasried, Bavaria
Langenthal, Kassel, in the municipality of Trendelburg, Hesse 
Langenthal, Bergstraße, in the municipality of Hirschhorn (Neckar), Hesse

In Switzerland
Langenthal, Switzerland, in the Canton of Bern